George Ivory may refer to:

George Ivory (footballer) (1910–1992), English professional footballer
George Ivory (basketball) (born 1965), American basketball coach